Waterhen Lake is a lake in Meadow Lake Provincial Park in the Canadian province of Saskatchewan, located about  north of the city of Meadow Lake. The lake is situated along the course of the Waterhen River in the boreal forest ecozone of Canada.

At just over 10,000 hectares in size, it is the second largest lake at least partially within Meadow Lake Provincial Park–the largest being Cold Lake at the far western end of the park.

Waterhen Indian Reserve No. 130, the reserve community of the Waterhen Lake First Nation, surrounds most of the eastern portion of the lake and the western half of the lake and the far eastern shore are in Meadow Lake Provincial Park. Highways 904, 941, and 951 provide access to the lake.

Description
Waterhen Lake's primary tributary, the Waterhen River, flows east from Lac des Îles for about  into the southern shore of Waterhen Lake. The Waterhen River then flows out of the lake at the north-east corner in a north-eastly direction for approximately  into Beaver River, which flows into the Churchill River at Lac Île-à-la-Crosse. The Churchill River is a major river in the Hudson Bay drainage basin.

At the point where the Waterhen River flows into Waterhen Lake, it's a shallow, marshy delta with several other smaller lakes in the vicinity, including Niven Lake, which both Matkin and Iskwayach Lakes flow into, and Redmond Lake. Otter Creek, a tributary of Waterhen River, also flows into the delta. at the eastern end, Jarvis Lake opens up into Waterhen Lake. At the northern end of the lake, two notable tributaries flow into the lake in another marshy delta. Flotten River flows in from Flotten Lake and Short Creek drains Nesootao (Twin) Lakes and Little Lake.

Recreation
Situated in a provincial park, there are many recreational opportunities at Waterhen Lake, including boating, camping, fishing, and swimming.

On the western shore of the lake there is Waterhen Lake Campground, Tawaw Cabins, Tawaw Outfitters, and M & N Resort. Tawaw Cabins offers 14 cabins, 27 campsites, showers, washrooms, beach access, boat rentals, and a store at the outfitters. M & N also has beach access with rentals, fuel, long term and short term cabin rentals, and a store.

Fish species
Fish commonly found in the lake include the northern pike, walleye, yellow perch, and burbot.

See also
 List of lakes in Saskatchewan
 Tourism in Saskatchewan

References

Lakes of Saskatchewan
Meadow Lake No. 588, Saskatchewan
Division No. 17, Saskatchewan